Harry-Max (born Maxime Louis Charles Dichamp; 23 November 1901 – 13 March 1979) was a French film actor. He appeared in more than eighty films from 1938 to 1975.

Filmography

References

External links
 

1901 births
1979 deaths
Male actors from Paris
French male film actors
20th-century French male actors

☁